Nosymna is a genus of moths of the family Yponomeutidae.

Species
Nosymna lapillata - Meyrick, 
Nosymna macrorrhyncha - Meyrick, 1930 
Nosymna obnubila - Durrant, 1916 
Nosymna ochrochorda - Meyrick, 1924 
Nosymna punctata - Walsingham, 1900 
Nosymna repletella - Walker, 1864 
Nosymna stipella - Snellen, 1903 

Yponomeutidae